The battle of Trostianets was a military engagement during the 2022 Russian invasion of Ukraine. The city of Trostianets, in Sumy Oblast, was attacked by Russian forces of the 1st Guards Tank Army in late February as part of the Northeastern Ukraine offensive. Occupied for just over a month, it was re-captured by Ukrainian forces in late March, with the 1st Guards being badly mauled in the processes.

Battle

Russian offensive
Trostianets was attacked on the first day of the invasion, 24 February. Ukrainian territorial defense forces felled trees on the main routes into town, which slowed but did not halt the advance of Russian troops. Russian troops appeared in the city at about 10:00 Kyiv time and moved through Trostyanets to Okhtyrka, Sumy, Lebedyn and Hadyach. The city was captured by Russian forces on 1 March 2022. The Russian military headquarters was established at the town's main train station. In mid-March, some Russian troops were replaced with Russian-supported separatist forces.

Approximately 800 Russian troops occupied the city. During the occupation, Ukrainian police officers remained in the city incognito, supporting both local civilians and partisan forces operating in the area. On February 25, Ukrainian troops blew up a bridge south of the city in the village of Klymentove, stopping the advance of Russian troops towards the city of Okhtyrka. The town's mayor, Yuriy Bova, hid in nearby villages, receiving some criticism for his decision not to stay in town, but continued to coordinate Ukrainian resistance, including shelling of Russian positions. Reports of executions of civilians by Russian troops began in early March.

Ukrainian counter attack
A Ukrainian counter-offensive beginning on 23 March recaptured the city by 26 March. During the fighting, the town's hospital was shelled, with residents blaming Russian forces. After combat and shelling around the outskirts of the city, Russian troops largely withdrew overnight before the arrival of Ukrainian forces. An AFP report recorded "a dozen" destroyed or damaged tanks and armored vehicles. The New York Times reported that food had grown scarce by the time the city was recaptured by Ukraine.

Aftermath

After the fighting ceased, regional governor Dmytro Zhyvytskyi stated that some parts of the town remained mined, and that inflows of humanitarian aid were being arranged. Mayor Bova stated that at least 50 civilians had been killed by Russian occupiers.

After the occupation of the city, seven civilians were killed and at least two wounded due to traps laid by Russian soldiers across the town.

During the fighting and shelling, the Krasnotrostyanets forest experimental station, located in the house of the manager of the estates, Leopold Koenig, was destroyed (an architectural monument of national importance). As a result of the fire, the chocolate factory "Ukraine" "Mondelēz International" (formerly "Kraft Foods") was partially destroyed. The estate of the Nadarzhinskys-Golitsyns, a monument in honor of the 183rd tank brigade, the Smorodino locomotive depot of 1877, and the shop of the merchant Fyodor Kurilo (1908, an architectural monument of local importance) were damaged.

References 

Trostianets
February 2022 events in Ukraine
March 2022 events in Ukraine
Trostianets
History of Sumy Oblast